Kalakkura Chandru is a 2007 Indian Tamil-language comedy drama film directed by the duo Ravi-Raja. The movie stars Karthik, Radha Ravi and Pandiarajan,  It was a remake of Malayalam film One Man Show (2001) but failed to repeat the success at the box office.

Cast
 Karthik as Chandru	
 Radha Ravi as Ravi Verma
 Pandiarajan as Singampuli 
  Bhuvana as Shweta
 Urvashi as Host
 Mohan Raman as Advocate
 Singamuthu as Muthu
 Balu Anand as Police inspector
  Bayilvan Ranganathan as Veera Verma

Production
Ravi and Raja who earlier directed low-budget devotional films like Subramaniaswamy and Aarumugaswamy announced in 2005 that their next directorial is titled as Adhirshtham. The film is a remake of Malayalam blockbuster One Man Show directed by Shafi and starred Jayaram. Karthik appeared in this film thus making his comeback, he claimed that he selected this film because he wanted his comeback to be different.

Soundtrack
Music was composed by Sunil Xavier.

 "Echampai"
 "Macham Konda"
 "Nagakannil"
 "Sollava Naan Sollava"

Release
After two years of making, the film was finally released on 14 January 2007 on the eve of Pongal with low publicity.

References

Tamil remakes of Malayalam films
2007 films
2000s Tamil-language films